La Farina (1911–1935) was a French Thoroughbred racehorse and sire who was noted for his rivalry with his contemporary Sardanapale and has been regarded as one of the best French horses of the 20th century. In 1913 he showed promise as a juvenile, winning the Prix La Rochette. In the following year he defeated Sardanapale in the Prix Daru and the Prix Lupin before being narrowly beaten by his rival in the Grand Prix de Paris. La Farina's racing career was curtailed by the outbreak of the First World War but he went on to become a successful sire of winners. He died in 1935.

Background
La Farina was a "light and narrow" chestnut horse with four white socks bred in France by his owner Edouard Alphonse de Rothschild. He was the best horse sired by Sans Souci, who won the Grand Prix de Paris for Rothschild in 1907. His dam Malatesta was a daughter of English Triple Crown winner Isinglass. Malatesta was descended from the broodmare Charlotte Russe, whose other descendants have included the Kentucky Derby winner Gallahadion and the Prix de l'Arc de Triomphe winner Eclair au Chocolat. La Farina was trained during his racing career by John Watson and ridden in his major races by Frank O'Neill.

Racing career

1913: two-year-old season
As a two-year-old, La Farina contested the prestigious Prix Morny at Deauville Racecourse but was beaten by Sardanapale a colt owned by Edouard de Rothchild's cousin Maurice de Rothschild. In the following month he recorded his first major victory when he won the colts' division of the Prix La Rochette over 1100 metres at Longchamp Racecourse.

1914: three-year-old season
In the spring of 1914, La Farina finished second to Listman in the Poule d'Essai des Poulains and ran third behind Durbar (later to win The Derby) in the Prix Biennale. On his next appearance he was matched against Sardanapale, who had won the Prix Lagrange and Prix Hocquart, in the Prix Daru over 2100 metres at Longchamp. He defeated his rival and won again when the colts met for the third time in the Prix Lupin over the same course and distance.

On 28 June, La Farina faced Sardanapale yet again in the Grand Prix de Paris over 3000 metres at Longchamp Racecourse. La Farina led from the start and when Sardanapale up to challenge 800 metres out, the two colts drew away from the rest of the field. After a prolonged struggle, Sardanapale got the better of La Farina 100 metres from the finish and won by a neck, with a gap of four lengths back to Durbar in third place.

In July, La Farina contested the Prix du Président de la République over 2500 metres at Maisons-Laffitte Racecourse but failed to reproduce his earlier form and finished unplaced behind Sardanapale. Shortly afterwards, the outbreak of the War led to the suspension of horse racing in France.

Stud record
La Farina was retired from racing to become a breeding stallion. The best of his winners included:

Tapin (1921), Prix Greffulhe, Poule d'Essai des Poulains, Lincolnshire Handicap.
Mont Bernina (1923), Jockey Club Cup
Bubbles (1925), Prix Lupin and the Prix du Président de la République 
Lovelace (1927), Prix d'Ispahan, Prix du Prince d'Orange and Prix de la Forêt
Crudité (1932), Grand Prix de Paris

Assessment
In their book A Century of Champions, based on a modified version of the Timeform system, John Randall and Tony Morris rated La Farina the sixty-sixth best racehorse of twentieth century, the thirteenth-best of the century to have been trained in France, and the second best horse in the world in 1914. The authors commented that La Farina's defeat in the Grand Prix "prevented him receiving the recognition he deserved a one of France's greatest horses".

Pedigree

La Farina was inbred 3 x 4 to St Simon, meaning that this stallion appears in both the third and fourth generations of his pedigree.

References

1911 racehorse births
1935 racehorse deaths
Racehorses bred in France
Racehorses trained in France
Thoroughbred family 4-e